Lime Hotspurs Football Club is a Zambian football club based in Ndola. They play in the top division of Zambian football, the Zambian Premier League.

The clubs plays in white and black kits.

Stadium
Currently the team plays at the 5,000 capacity Indeni Sports Complex.

References

External links
Club logo
Soccerway
Calciozz

Football clubs in Zambia